Russula paludosa is an edible species of mushroom within the large genus Russula. It is common to Europe and North America.

Description

The cap is convex to depressed and is coloured a distinctive bloody red, pink, crimson or purple. Sometimes it may show a yellowish or orange tinge in the centre. It may measure between 6 and 20 cm in diameter. The flesh is white with a mild taste and without scent; it quickly becomes soft and spongy and also greyish. The crowded gills are cream coloured when young, and become yellow with age. They are adnexed and are generally thin. Their edges may sometimes occur reddish. The amyloid, elli spores measure 8–10 by 7–10 μm are warty and are covered by an incomplete mesh. The stem is white, sometimes with a pink hue, slightly clubbed. It may measure 5 to 15 cm in height and up to 3 cm in diameter.

Distribution, ecology and habitat
R. paludosa is mycorrhizal and occurs in coniferous woodlands and in peat bogs of Europe and North America; preferably under pine trees, where it forms mycorrhizae. Locally it can be very common.

Edibility
The mushroom is edible and is a common good in Finnish markets. Yet it may easily be mistaken for Russula emetica, which is poisonous.

See also
List of Russula species

References

Further reading

External links

 Russula paludosa in First Nature

paludosa
Fungi of Europe
Fungi of North America
Edible fungi
Fungi described in 1891
Taxa named by Max Britzelmayr